The Peshawar Conspiracy Cases were a set of five legal cases which took place between 1922 and 1927 in British India. The mujahirs, a group of muslims, were inspired from communist revolution and went to USSR for training in 1920. Some of the returned to India in 1921 from Tashkent to incite a revolution. The British intelligence got information about it from their foreign office and the police arrested the first batch of revolutionaries and sent them away to a sham trial. 

The defendants in these cases had sneaked into British India from the Soviet Union to allegedly foment a proletarian revolution against British colonial rule. The colonial government feared that the defendants were entering India with the purpose of spreading socialist and communist ideas and supporting the emerging independence movement.

It was not the only case which became popular and galvanized the imagination of the young population of the Indian subcontinent, there were similar such cases. Among them, the Kanpur Bolshevik Case of May 1924 can be quoted as a substantiating case.

See also
 Communist Party of Pakistan

References

Bibliography

History of Peshawar
Pakistan–Soviet Union relations
Communism in Pakistan
History of Pakistan
1922 in international relations
Soviet Union–United Kingdom relations
1920s in British India
1922 in British law
Communist Party of India
Indian independence movement